The Town of Ithaca is a former local government area of Queensland, Australia, located in inner western Brisbane.

History
The Ithaca Division was first proclaimed in 1879, and originally covered an area that stretched from Windsor, Kelvin Grove and Milton in the east, through to The Gap and beyond the Enoggera Dam in the west. In 1887 the division was split into the Shire of Windsor and the Enoggera Division, with the remainder in the south east becoming the Shire of Ithaca. Ithaca was proclaimed a town in 1903.

On 25 February 1922, Sir Matthew Nathan, the Governor of Queensland unveiled the Ithaca War Memorial to commemorate local people who had died in World War I.

Ithaca was amalgamated into the newly created City of Brisbane in 1925.

Geography
The Town of Ithaca comprised most of the inner western suburbs of Brisbane from Kelvin Grove Road to the foot of Mount Coot-tha. Its boundary followed Enoggera Creek to the north, Coopers Camp, Simpsons and Boundary Roads in Bardon to the west, and Baroona and Milton Roads to the south. Hale Street and an area just before the junction of Waterworks/Musgrave Road and Kelvin Grove Road formed the south-eastern extremity of the town. This eastern boundary was shared with the Brisbane Municipal Council; the Brisbane side of Hale Street was paved and channelled while the Ithaca side was not.

Ithaca Town Council Chambers

The Ithaca Town Council Chambers were built in 1910 at 99 Enoggera Terrace, in the then suburb of Ithaca (now in the suburb of Red Hill). With the amalgamation into City of Brisbane in 1925, the building became the property of the Brisbane City Council. Since then it has been used as a council depot, library and as the Red Hill Kindergarten. It is currently used as a community hall.

The Ithaca Town Council Chambers was listed on the Queensland Heritage Register in 2000.

The Ithaca Embankments, a council urban beautification scheme, were listed on the Queensland Heritage Register in 1993.

Presidents and mayors
 1888–1889: George Edward Cooper
 1890: W. I. Boys
 1901: Arthur George Clarence Hawthorn
 1906: George Phillip Reading
 1907: George Thomas Sweetman
 1908: Robert McCook
 1909: George Hall
 1910: James Bray Lugg
 1911: Silvanus White
 1912: Frederick Thomas Morris
 1913: Arthur George Clarence Hawthorn
 1914: Robert Speedy
 1915: William Robert Warmington
 1916: James Bray Lugg
 1917: John Tait
 1918: Arthur Kaye
 1919: John Fairfax Hayward
 1920: Frederick Edward Hampson
 1921: Leslie Howard Tooth
 1925: William Robert Warmington

See also

History of Brisbane

References

External links
 University of Queensland: Queensland Places: Ithaca
 Google map of Pre 1925 merger Brisbane Councils

Former local government areas of Queensland
Red Hill, Queensland
Ithaca, Queensland
1925 disestablishments in Australia
1879 establishments in Australia
Populated places established in 1879